Murugathasan Varnakulasingham (2 December 1982 – 13 February 2009) was a Sri Lankan Tamil, one of seven who immolated themselves to protest the treatment of Tamil people by the government of Sri Lanka. 

Varnakulasingham was a computing graduate and part-time Sainsbury's shelf-stacker. He went to Geneva from his house on Grange Avenue, Belmont, Harrow, to protest the Sri Lankan government war against the Tamils. On 13 February 2009, after days of protesting, Varnakulasingham poured petrol over his body and killed himself at the gate of United Nations headquarters in Geneva. He was 26.

He wrote a letter explaining his choice, writing that 

His family stated that they were proud of their son's action and his death was commemorated by British Tamils.

References

External Links
 Eezham Tamil immolates himself to death in front of UN office in Geneva

1982 births
2009 deaths
2009 suicides
Deaths by person in Europe
Suicides by self-immolation
Suicides in Switzerland
Tamil people